Hyoscyamus — known as the henbanes — is a small genus of flowering plants in the nightshade family, Solanaceae. It comprises 11 species, all of which are toxic. It, along with other genera in the same family, is a source of the drug hyoscyamine (daturine).Cruciferous type of stomata present in Hyoscyamus.

Hyoscyamus means "hog-bean" in botanical Latin and was a name derogatorily applied to the plant by Dioscorides.

The poisonous, narcotic henbanes were associated with witchcraft since earliest times. The Assyrians recommended hanging them on one's door to ward off sorcery. Witches found them valuable especially due to their trance-inducing capabilities. They have been used to lessen pain, neuralgia and diminish convulsions. Dioscorides recommended them largely for external pain killing use. The leaves are made into a kind of cigarette to relieve asthma and other respiratory ailments.

Selected species

References

External links

 
Hyoscyameae
Solanaceae genera